Greatest Hits is a re-recorded studio album by American country artists Jack Greene and Jeannie Seely. It was released in 1982 and was co-produced by Tommy Hill and Moe Lytle for Gusto Records. Although titled as Greatest Hits, the album contained new recordings of songs that Greene and Seely cut for the Gusto label. These recordings were remakes of original tunes that both artists had previously cut themselves.

It would later be reissued in different formats. In 1994, the album was reissued on Hollywood Records with an identical track listing to the original.

Background and content
Greatest Hits was recorded in the fall of 1981 at the Gusto Recording Studio, which was located in Nashville, Tennessee. The sessions were co-produced by Tommy Hill and Moe Lytle. The original release of the album consisted of ten tracks. Some of these tracks were solo recordings while some were duets between Greene and Seely. Regardless of lead vocalist credits, all songs had been previously recorded by both artists. However, all the songs were re-recorded for the project. Among the solo re-recordings was the song "There Goes My Everything" by Greene. In 1967, Greene recorded the original version which became a number 1 hit on the Billboard country songs chart. Another solo re-recording was "Don't Touch Me" by Seely. In 1966, Seely had cut the original version which became a number 2 hit on the Billboard country chart and won a Grammy Award.

Two previously unrecorded tracks were featured on the album as well. The seventh track, "We Don't Want the World", was a new duet between Greene and Seely. The tenth track, "Beautiful Lady", was a new solo recording by Greene. The album also included duet re-recordings. Among these was the track "Wish I Didn't Have to Miss You". The original recording on Decca Records became a major hit in 1970, reaching number 2 on the Billboard country chart. In 1982 Greatest Hits first released on Gusto Records as a vinyl record, with five songs on side one and five songs on side two. The original album release promoted two 1981 singles released on Gusto: "There Goes My Everything" and "Don't Touch Me".

In 1994, the album was reissued on Hollywood Records in cassette and compact disc formats.

Track listing

Original vinyl version

Cassette version

Compact disc version

Release history

References

1982 albums
Jack Greene albums
Jeannie Seely albums